The North Banat District is one of seven administrative districts of the autonomous province of Vojvodina, Serbia. It lies in the geographical regions of Banat and Bačka. According to the 2011 census, the district has a population of 146,690 inhabitants. The administrative center of the district is the city of Kikinda.

Administrative history
In the 9th century, the area was ruled by the Bulgarian-Slavic dukes Glad (in the east) and Salan (in the west), while in the 11th century, the eastern part of the area was ruled by duke Ahtum. From 11th to 16th century, during the administration of the medieval Kingdom of Hungary, the area was divided between the Csanadiensis County, Temesiensis County and Torontaliensis County in the east, and Csongradiensis County, Bacsensis County and Bodrogiensis County in the west. Part of the area was also located within the Cumania region. In 1526-1527, the area was ruled by the independent Serb ruler, emperor Jovan Nenad, while during Ottoman administration (16th-18th century), it was divided between the Temeşvar Eyalet in the east and the Sanjak of Segedin in the west.

During Habsburg administration (18th century), the area was divided between the Banat of Temeswar in the east and the Military Frontier in the west. Since the abolishment of the Theiß-Marosch section of the Military Frontier (in 1751), and abolishment of the Banat of Temeswar (in 1778), the area was divided between the Torontal County in the east and the Batsch-Bodrog County in the west, with a small part of it that was located within the Tschongrad County. Much of the area was part of the autonomous districts of Velika Kikinda (existed from 1774 to 1876 within the Torontal County) in the east and Potisje (existed from 1751 to 1848 within the Batsch-Bodrog County) in the west. In the 1850s, the area was divided between the Veliki Bečkerek District in the east and Sombor and Novi Sad districts in the west. After 1860, it was again divided between Torontal, Batsch-Bodrog and Tschongrad counties.

During the Yugoslav administration (1918-1941), the area was initially (from 1918 to 1922) divided between the Veliki Bečkerek County in the east and the Novi Sad County in the west. From 1922 to 1929, it was part of the Belgrade Oblast, and from 1929 to 1941 part of the Danube Banovina.

During the German-Hungarian Axis occupation (1941-1944), the area was divided between the Banat autonomous region (part of German-occupied puppet state of Serbia) in the east and the Bács-Bodrog County (an administrative unit of Horthy's Hungary) in the west. Initially, the Banat region was part of the rump Danube Banovina (whose capital was moved to Smederevo), but since December 1941, it was organized as one of the districts of Serbia and was officially named the District of Veliki Bečkerek.

Since 1944, the area was part of autonomous Yugoslav Vojvodina (which was part of new socialist Yugoslav Serbia since 1945). The present-day districts of Serbia (including North Banat District) were defined by the Government of Serbia's Enactment of 29 January 1992.

Municipalities
The North Banat District comprises the city of Kikinda, five municipalities and 50 local communities.  The municipalities are
 Kanjiža (Hungarian: Magyarkanizsa)
 Senta (Hungarian: Zenta)
 Ada (Hungarian: Ada)
 Čoka (Hungarian: Csóka)
 Novi Kneževac

Note: for municipalities with Hungarian ethnic majority, the names are also given in Hungarian.

An interesting fact is that the first three municipalities enlisted (Kanjiža, Senta and Ada) are geographically, in fact, in the Bačka region since the natural border between Banat and Bačka is the river Tisa.

Demographics

According to the last official census done in 2011, the North Banat District has 147,770 inhabitants.

Ethnic groups
Hungarians are the largest ethnic group in the district at 46.64%, closely followed by Serbs at 42.67%. Municipalities with Serb ethnic majority are Kikinda (75.43%) and Novi Kneževac (57.19%), while municipalities with Hungarian ethnic majority are: Čoka (49.66%), Ada (75.03%), Senta (79.09%) and Kanjiža (85.13%). As for local communities, 29 have Hungarian majority, 19 have Serb majority, and 2 are ethnically mixed, with Hungarian relative majority.

The ethnic composition of the district (as of 2011 census):

Culture
The first modern Serb printing-house was founded in Kikinda in 1878, to be followed a year later by the opening of the first library.

This city is also reputable for its painters, including Teodor Ilić Češljar, Nikola Aleksić, Đura Pecić, and Đura Jakšić, a painter and author.

Kikinda was the scene of the region's first theatrical performance, given in German, in 1796.

See also
 Administrative divisions of Serbia
 Districts of Serbia
 District of Velika Kikinda

References

Note: All official material made by Government of Serbia is public by law. Information was taken from official website.

External links

 

 
Geography of Vojvodina
Banat
Districts of Vojvodina